This page is a glossary of terms  in invariant theory. 
For descriptions of particular invariant rings, see invariants of a binary form, symmetric polynomials. 
For geometric terms used in invariant theory see the glossary of classical algebraic geometry. 

Conventions

!$@

A

B

C

D

E

F

G

H

I

J

K

L

M

N

O

P

Q

R

S

T

U

V

W

XYZ

See also

Glossary of classical algebraic geometry

References

 Reprinted as

External links

Invariant theory
Invariant theory
History of mathematics
Wikipedia glossaries using description lists